Anurag Agrawal (born 1972) is an American professor of ecology, evolutionary biology, and entomology who has written over a 150 peer-reviewed articles, which earned him an h-index of 92.  He is the author of a popular science book, Monarchs and Milkweeds from Princeton University Press, and is currently the James Alfred Perkins Professor of Environmental Studies at Cornell University.

Life
Agrawal was born in 1972 in Allentown, Pennsylvania. He obtained both BA in biology and an MA in conservation biology from the University of Pennsylvania in Philadelphia after working with Daniel Janzen. In 1999, he earned a Ph.D. in population biology from the University of California, Davis. He then became a post-doctoral fellow at the University of Amsterdam. A year later, he became an assistant professor at the University of Toronto in the former department of botany. Since 2004, he has been a professor in the Department of Ecology and Evolutionary Biology and Department of Entomology at Cornell University in Ithaca, New York. He publishes with a fictitious middle initial (A.), and is sometimes confused with Canadian evolutionary biologist Aneil Agrawal.

Research
His work is focused on the ecology and evolution of plant-insect interactions, including aspects of herbivory, community ecology, phenotypic plasticity, chemical ecology, coevolution, and phylogenetics. His current research includes work on New York state's biodiversity, the ecology of invasive plants, the biology of monarch butterflies, and the evolution of plant defense strategies. In addition to many scientific papers, his recent book Monarchs and Milkweeds has received acclaim from a wide audience, including the National Outdoor Book Award.

Awards
1999 Young Investigator Award, American Society of Naturalists
2004 Early Career Award, National Science Foundation
2006 George Mercer Award, Ecological Society of America
2009 David Starr Jordan Prize
2012 Fellow of the American Association for the Advancement of Science
2013 Founders Memorial Award, Entomological Society of America
2016 Robert H. MacArthur Award, Ecological Society of America
2017 National Outdoor Book Award
2017 Fellow of the Ecological Society of America
2018 Silverstein-Simeone Lecture Award, International Society for Chemical Ecology
2019 Edward O. Wilson Naturalist Award
2021 Member of the National Academy of Sciences

References

External links
Anurag Agrawal at Cornell University
Monarchs and Milkweed, Princeton University Press
Anurag Agrawal  s Google Scholar citations

1972 births
Living people
American ecologists
Chemical ecologists
University of Pennsylvania School of Arts and Sciences alumni
University of California, Davis alumni
Cornell University faculty
Academic staff of the University of Amsterdam
Educators from Allentown, Pennsylvania
Scientists from Allentown, Pennsylvania
Writers from Allentown, Pennsylvania
American academics of Indian descent
Fellows of the Ecological Society of America
Members of the United States National Academy of Sciences